Shuwanza Goff is an American political advisor serving as the deputy director of the White House Office of Legislative Affairs. In January 2019, she was named floor director for legislative operations for Majority Leader Steny Hoyer, making her the first African-American woman to serve as floor director.

Early life and education

Shuwanza Goff lived in New York City, alongside her sister April, as a child. Her parents are Robert and Hershular Smith-Goff.  In the 1990s, the family moved to Mechanicsville, Virginia. Goff attended a private school in Richmond, Virginia.

Goff became interested in politics at a young age. When Goff was young, her parents used to take her and her sister with them on Election Day to vote. They would let Goff pull the voting machine lever to submit their votes. The family talked about politics regularly at dinner. When David Dinkins lost to Rudy Giuliani in New York City's 1993 mayoral race, Goff wrote a letter to Dinkins expressing her frustration. Hillary Clinton visited Goff's school when Goff was in the fourth grade. The fourth graders did not get to see Clinton, resulting in Goff holding a protest to bring attention to the fact the grade didn't get to see Clinton.

In high school, Goff decided to attend the University of Tennessee after a student at the university spoke to Goff's class in high school. Goff earned her bachelor's degree in political science in 2006. She earned her Master of Arts degree in justice, law, and society from American University in 2008. She served as an intern on Capitol Hill.

Career

In 2008, Goff joined Steny Hoyer's office as staff assistant with the intention to leave the position at the end of the congressional cycle. However, by 2012 she was serving as Hoyer's deputy director of legislative operations.

In January 2019, Goff was named floor director for legislative operations for Hoyer. Goff was the first African American woman to serve as floor director. In this position, Goff communicates across party lines, negotiating on behalf of the Democrats, preparing the agenda and schedule for bills, and wider coordination between Congress, the Senate, and the White House.

Goff was named deputy director of the White House Office of Legislative Affairs, alongside Reema Dodin, for the Biden administration in November 2020. In February, 2023, it was reported she would be leaving the White House to join the lobbying firm Cornerstone Government Affairs.

Personal life

Goff lives in northern Virginia.

References

External links
Shuwanza Goff's profile from the Biden-Harris Transition website

Living people
African-American people
American University alumni
University of Tennessee alumni
Biden administration personnel
People from New York City
People from Mechanicsville, Virginia
Year of birth missing (living people)